The discography of British singer-songwriter Raye consists of one studio album, one mini-album, six extended plays (EPs), thirty four singles (including ten as a featured artist), ten promotional singles and twelve guest appearances. In addition to her own releases, Raye has also been a songwriter for other artists including Beyonce, Little Mix, Mabel, Zara Larsson, Ellie Goulding and Hailee Steinfeld.

In 2014, Raye's first EP, Welcome to the Winter, was released via SoundCloud as a free download. Following this, Raye released her debut single "I, U, Us" in 2016, after releasing her label debut EP, Second under Polydor Records earlier the same year. Raye would feature on the commercially successful singles "By Your Side" by Jonas Blue and "You Don't Know Me" by Jax Jones in late 2016. The latter collaboration charted at number three on the UK Singles Chart and was certified double platinum. Raye's third EP, Side Tape was released in May 2018 following the singles "Decline" featuring Mr Eazi, and "Cigarette" with Mabel and Stefflon Don, the former being certified Platinum in the United Kingdom and peaking in the top twenty of the charts. 

In 2019, Raye released the singles "Love Me Again", which later received a remix from Jess Glynne, "Please Don't Touch" and two David Guetta collaborations, "Stay (Don't Go Away)" and "Make It to Heaven", the latter also featuring producer Morten. These singles were followed by the 2020 releases; "All of My Love" with Young Adz, "Natalie Don't", "Love of Your Life" and "Regardless" with Rudimental plus the collaborations; "Tequila" with Jax Jones and Martin Solveig and "Secrets" with Regard. The latter peaked inside the top ten of the UK Singles Chart and was certified platinum by the BPI. Raye's first mini-album, titled Euphoric Sad Songs was released in November 2020. In early 2021, "Bed" with Joel Corry and David Guetta was released. The single peaked at number three on the UK Singles Chart, becoming Raye's highest-charting single as a lead artist on the chart. "Call On Me" followed as a single in June 2021. 

Following her departure from Polydor Records, Raye released the single "Hard Out Here", her first as an independent artist. Raye's debut studio album, My 21st Century Blues, was released on 3 February 2023. The album was preceded by singles "Hard Out Here", "Black Mascara", "Escapism" featuring 070 Shake and "The Thrill Is Gone". Following the track going viral on multiple streaming platforms, "Escapism" became the singer's first number one single in the UK. The single also became her first to chart on the Billboard Hot 100 and became her highest charting song in various territories.

Studio albums

Mini-albums

Extended plays

Singles

As lead artist

As featured artist

Promotional singles

Other charted songs

Guest appearances

Songwriting credits
 indicates a background vocal contribution.

 indicates an un-credited lead vocal contribution.

 indicates a credited vocal/featured artist contribution.

Notes

References 

Discographies of British artists